Bruce Beattie is an American political cartoonist. His work was nationally syndicated in the United States and also appeared in magazine and books. He drew the syndicated Beattie Boulevard, which was published in several newspapers. He also served as the President of the National Cartoonists Society.

Early life
Beattie was born in New York City. He graduated from Kent School in Kent, Connecticut in 1972 and University of Pennsylvania.

References

External links

Billy Ireland Cartoon Library & Museum Art Database

1954 births
Living people
American cartoonists
Artists from New York City
Kent School alumni
University of Pennsylvania alumni